Cyrus Melikian (1920–2008) was an Armenian-American coffee industry pioneer credited with several inventions that propelled coffee use into the American public. He is credited, along with his business partner, Lloyd Rudd, as the inventor of coffee vending machines and the first US fresh-brew machine. Furthermore, Cyrus was instrumental in several other inventions, including coffee pods, post-mix vendor icemakers, and in-machine coffee bean grinders.

He initiated the Culinary Institute at Rockland Mansion in  Fairmount Park. Melikian also established the Flavor-Maker Culinary Chef's Training School, and taught there for 10 years. Melikian was awarded with the Person of the Year Award by the Tea & Coffee Trade Journal in 2002.

After Rudd-Melikian was sold and became Refreshment Machinery, Melikian and his sons founded Automatic Brewers & Coffee Devices (Conshohocken, PA). Melikian had designed a method of sandwiching finely ground roast coffee between two long strips of filter paper, supplied in rolls for the RMi fresh-brew machine.

Melikian's entrepreneurial spirit and passion lives on through his grandchildren Pearce Fielding Lockwood, Alexander Melikian, Anayis Melikian, Armen Melikian, Hunter Harrison, and Casey Harrison. All of whom had the rare privilege of learning from Mr. Melikian himself.

Patents

References

External links
 

1920 births
2008 deaths
American people of Armenian descent
Businesspeople in coffee
20th-century American inventors